The Kondivite Caves, also Mahakali Caves, are a group of 19 rock-cut monuments built between 1st century BCE and 6th century CE.

This Buddhist monastery is located in the eastern suburb of Andheri in the city of Mumbai (Bombay) in western India. The monument consists of two groups of rock-cut caves – 4 caves more to the north-west and 15 caves more to the south-east. Most caves are viharas and cells for monks, but Cave 9 of the south-eastern group is chaitya. Caves in the northwest have been created mainly in the 4th – 5th century, while the south-eastern group is older. The monument contains also rock-cut cisterns and remnants of other structures.

Caves are carved out of a solid black basalt rock,(volcanic trap breccias, prone to weathering).

The largest cave at Kondivite (Cave 9) has seven depictions of the Buddha and figures from Buddhist mythology but all are mutilated.

It is located near the junction between the Jogeshwari-Vikhroli Link Road and SEEPZ. The road that connects these monuments to Andheri Kurla Road is named Mahakali Caves Road after it. The caves are located on a hill that overlooks the Jogeshwari-Vikhroli Link Road and the SEEPZ++ area. A Direct bus run by the BEST links the caves with Andheri station. The caves were in danger of being encroached upon, but now it is steel fenced on the roadside and walled on the hillside.

See also 

 Indian rock-cut architecture

References

External links 

 The Mahakali Caves – Secret World

Buddhist caves in India
Buddhist monasteries in India
Buddhist pilgrimage sites in India
Buddhist temples in India
Caves containing pictograms in India
Former populated places in India
Indian rock-cut architecture
Stupas in India